Magdaly Trujillo (born 7 August 1984) is a Colombian former professional racing cyclist. She won the Colombian National Road Race Championships in 2006.

References

External links
 

1984 births
Living people
Colombian female cyclists
Cyclists at the 2003 Pan American Games
Place of birth missing (living people)
Pan American Games competitors for Colombia
20th-century Colombian women
21st-century Colombian women
Competitors at the 2006 Central American and Caribbean Games